is a fictional character from the Donkey Kong and Mario  video game franchises by Nintendo. She was created by Japanese video game designer Shigeru Miyamoto and first appeared in Donkey Kong (1981) as the damsel in distress, being held captive by Donkey Kong at the top of a large construction site.

Concept and creation
Pauline was created by Shigeru Miyamoto and other developers for the 1981 arcade game Donkey Kong. She is the first female character in a video game with a speaking role, and is cited as a famous example of a damsel in distress in fiction. The name Pauline was given after the then-girlfriend of Nintendo of America's warehouse manager, Don James. It was then used in licensed products after the game's release (including a collection of figures by Coleco and a coloring book), and was eventually used for the NES version of the game, although print ads for the Game & Watch version of the game refer to her as Louise.

Super Mario Odyssey producer Yoshiaki Koizumi told Polygon that she sang the game's theme song, "Jump Up, Super Star!", noting "As we were developing Pauline more as a character, we know that she was going to be interested in jazz...It was interesting for us to have the first song in a Mario game with vocals". This is inaccurate, however, as Super Mario Run had previously featured a track with vocals that was added in an update released one month prior to Odyssey.

Appearances
Pauline debuted as Mario's love interest in Donkey Kong (1981), which was remade for Game Boy, where she was again a typical damsel in distress. 

Reappearances of Pauline occurred in Pinball and Famicom BASIC. Outside of Donkey Kong ports and re-releases, she did not make any further appearances until her reintroduction in the Mario vs. Donkey Kong series. She would appear in all of its sequels. 

In 2017, Super Mario Odyssey marked her debut in the Super Mario series. She is the singer of "Jump Up, Super Star!" and "Break Free (Lead The Way)". Initially a damsel in distress, Super Mario Odyssey changed her role. She was now the singer of the band The Super Mario Players and the Mayor of New Donk City. She serves as a supporting character, helping Mario with his quest. 

In Super Smash Bros. Ultimate, she, along with her band, appear on the New Donk City stage; by interacting with them, the player can add extra instruments and vocals to the music. Pauline herself is also featured as a collectible spirit utilizing her Super Mario Odyssey artwork. In March 2019, Pauline made her debut in a Mario sports spinoff as a playable DLC character in Mario Tennis Aces. In September 2019, she made her racing debut in Mario Kart Tour. She has also appeared as a playable character in Mario Golf: Super Rush and Mario Strikers: Battle League.

Reception
Prior to the release of Super Mario Odyssey, Pauline's limited role as a helpless damsel who became mostly forgotten by Nintendo had been criticized. Ethan Gach from Kotaku stated "Pauline has been trotted out as a helpless hostage all these years". Mic initially called Pauline a "run-of-the-mill, absurdly-beautiful-yet-helpless human woman". IGN reviewed Pauline positively, giving her an 8 out of 10, but commented "We think it's time to the dodge those barrels once again, and see about a girl named Pauline". To rectify this, in 2012, a man re-modded the original Donkey Kong arcade game to allow players to play as Pauline instead of Jumpman, to please his 3-year-old daughter. The father, Mika Mika, explained that his daughter wanted to play as a girl character, but was unable to due the lack of female playable characters in early video games. The modding efforts help to spark interest in female characters in gaming across social media, in sighting video game expert Scott Steinberg to say that developers should "wake up and realize that there is a broader audience", hoping that they can expand the general gaming community. 

After her reappearance in Super Mario Odyssey, her character was praised for overcoming the damsel in distress archetype to become a woman of power. Bleeding Cool wrote about how it was a "big deal" for Pauline's sudden return, feeling that was an injustice that she had been negated to merely a plot point until then, citing it as "one hell of a patriarchy-smashing comeback". Paste writer Holly Green included Pauline as one of the best new game characters of 2017. Nadia Oxford of USGamer has included Pauline in her "best new Nintendo character of the past decade". Gabe Gurwin of Digital Trends placed Pauline first in their top ten new characters they hope to see in the Super Smash Bros. series. Screen Rant included Pauline in their top ten female characters who deserve their own video game.

"Jump Up, Super Star!"

The song "Jump Up, Super Star!" from Super Mario Odyssey debuted at number 33 on the Billboard Japan Hot 100 for the week of 11 November 2017. The song has Japanese recordings at various lengths sung by Aimi Mukohara and English releases by Kate Higgins, credited as Kate Davis. Super Mario Odyssey won "Best Original Music" in IGN's Best of 2017, with IGN praising the song by stating that it is an "immediate earworm that brilliantly capitalizes on the legacy of the Mario franchise while also standing out as a new approach to music for the series". Screen Rant included the song in their top ten best songs from Super Mario Odyssey, calling it "beautifully done". Kate Higgins lip-synced "Jump Up, Super Star!" during the 2017 Game Awards ceremony when Super Mario Odyssey was nominated for Game of the Year.

Notes

References

Donkey Kong characters
Female characters in video games
Video game characters introduced in 1981
Fictional jazz musicians
Fictional mayors
Singer characters in video games
Mario (franchise) characters
Nintendo protagonists
Animated human characters
Politician characters in video games